Georg Busch (11 March 1862, Hanau – 8 October 1943, Munich) was a German sculptor. His works were primarily of a religious nature.

Biography 
His father, Johann Georg Busch (1823–1895) was a carpenter, wood sculptor and altar builder who established a church art workshop in 1863. It was there that he received his initial training. He was given a scholarship, by the Grand Duchy of Hesse, that enabled him to study sculpture at the Academy of Fine Arts, Munich. His primary instructor there was Syrius Eberle.

In 1888, his eldest brother, Jacob, took over the family business, which enabled him to remain in Munich as a free-lance sculptor. Through his membership there, he worked to promote quality religious art. Much of it, in the late 19th-century, came from factory-like workshops, similar to his father's.

Over the years, he helped create and participated in a wide variety of related organizations: the German Society for Christian Art (1893), where he served two terms as president after 1924; the Society for Christian Art Exhibitions and sales (1900); and the Associated Exhibition House for Christian Art (1918).

With the help of his wife, Marie, he was also the proprietor of a publishing house; the "Allgemeine Vereinigung für christliche Kunst" (General Association for Christian Art), which was in operation from 1909 until his death. He focused on art history, and produced books for children, all reasonably priced. His firm issued around 100 titles altogether.   

A street in the Steinheim district of Hanau has been named after him. His son, was an art historian.

References

Further reading 
 Oskar Doering: "Georg Busch", In: Die Christliche Kunst, Vol.8, Nr. 6, 1911–12, (Online)  
 "Busch, Georg". In: Allgemeines Künstlerlexikon, Die Bildenden Künstler aller Zeiten und Völker (AKL). Vol.15, Saur, 1996,  pg.307
 "Busch, Georg". In: Ulrich Thieme (Ed.): Allgemeines Lexikon der Bildenden Künstler von der Antike bis zur Gegenwart, Vol.5: Brewer–Carlingen. E. A. Seemann, Leipzig 1911, pg.281 (Online)
 Roswitha Busch-Hofer: Bildhauer Georg Busch. Kunstverlag Josef Fink, Lindenberg im Allgäu 2013,

External links 

 "Die Bildhauerfamilie Busch in Hanau" @ the Steinheim website
 "Künstler in christlichem Auftrag" @ Offenbach Post

1862 births
1943 deaths
German sculptors
Religious sculptures
Academy of Fine Arts, Munich alumni
People from Hanau